Roberto "Malingas" Jiménez (born 17 April 1983 in Piura, Peru) is a Peruvian footballer who plays as a striker for Alianza Atlético in the Torneo Descentralizado.

Career
Jiménez began his career in 2003 at Alianza Atlético in the Peruvian Primera División. In 2005, he moved to Argentina to play for San Lorenzo, which acquired his rights.

In 2007, Jiménez joined Club Atlético Lanús on a loan helping the team win the Apertura 2007 tournament, its first ever top-flight league title. In 2008, Jiménez was loaned to Peruvian club Universitario de Deportes. In 2009, he returned to play in the Argentine Primera División with recently promoted team Godoy Cruz. After six months in Mendoza, the loan ended and he was sent to Sporting Cristal. On 7 January 2010, Deportes La Serena signed the forwards from Club Atlético San Lorenzo de Almagro "Malingas" on a 50% joint ownership deal.

Honours

External links
 Official Club Player Profile 
  
 
 
 

1983 births
Living people
People from Piura
Peruvian footballers
Peru international footballers
Peruvian expatriate footballers
Alianza Atlético footballers
San Lorenzo de Almagro footballers
Club Atlético Lanús footballers
Godoy Cruz Antonio Tomba footballers
Club Universitario de Deportes footballers
Sporting Cristal footballers
Deportes La Serena footballers
Unión Comercio footballers
Club Deportivo Universidad César Vallejo footballers
Peruvian Primera División players
Argentine Primera División players
Peruvian expatriate sportspeople in Argentina
Expatriate footballers in Argentina
Expatriate footballers in Chile
2007 Copa América players
Association football forwards